Nakshathrangal Parayathirunnathu is a 2001 Indian Malayalam language film directed by C S Sudesh. Starring Mukesh, Divya Unni, Lal, Innocent, Harisree Ashokan, Rajan P Dev, Jayabharathi and Narendra Prasad in the lead roles, the film released in the year 2001 in India. This film was one of Divya Unni's last films before her sabbatical.

Plot

Two friends, Nandakumar and Shashaankan, are in a desperate need of money. They decide to get their hands on some cash through unfair means.

Cast

Mukesh as Nandakumar
Lal as Gowrishankar
Narendra Prasad as Vasudeva Panicker
Rajan P Dev as Rajashekharan
Innocent as Govinda Kamath
Harisree Ashokan as Shashaankan
Divya Unni as Sivaranjini
Jayabharathi as Sivaranjini's Mother
Shantha Kumari as Deviamma

Soundtrack
"Nishagandhi Poothu (male)" - K. J. Yesudas
"Kukkoo Kukkoo Kuyil" - K. S. Chithra
"Anthimayangi (male)" - K. J. Yesudas
"Arikathoru" - M. G. Sreekumar
"Thillai Thillai" - M. G. Sreekumar, Smita
"Kukkoo Kukkoo Kuyil (male)" - K. J. Yesudas
"Anthimazha" - K. S. Chithra
"Nishagandhi Poothu" - K. S. Chithra

Production
The film was shot in Thrissur and nearby places.

Release
The film released during Onam.

References

2000 films
2000s Malayalam-language films
Films scored by Mohan Sithara